The Incheon Stadium, commonly known as the Incheon Asiad Main Stadium, is a stadium located in Incheon, South Korea. Completed in July 2014, it is used mostly for athletics meets and was the main venue of the 2014 Asian Games. The stadium has been designed with an initial capacity of roughly 60,000 spectators. After the 2014 Asian Games, capacity was reduced to 30,000 spectators. The stadium has an oval running track enclosing a regulation-size soccer field. Outside, there's a tennis court, a subsidiary stadium, and the 1,415.13 m2 Yeonhui Cricket Ground.

The main stadium was used for the opening and closing ceremony and athletics competitions of the 2014 Asian Games and 2014 Asian Para Games.  Utilizing the long linear landscape from South to North to actively connect to surrounding parks, and the natural continuity of the rooftops to facilitate the approach by spectators, in order to overcome the difficulty of approaching the long site while emphasizing the potential of the area. It attempts to depict the movements of people with the lines and soft curvatures of dancing in order to link with Seungmu (Buddhist dance), and to express dynamic movement with the tide and wind, which represent the sea of Incheon.

Design and Construction
On April 17, 2007, Incheon was chosen as the venue for the 16-day Asiad that will be held from September to October 2014. The total number of participants is about 20,000: 13,000 athletes and officials and 7,000 media from 45 National Olympic Committees (NOC).

Populous, the global architecture firm that also designed London's Olympic Stadium has designed the stadium in collaboration with Heerim Architects and Planners. The chief feature of the stadium is its sustainability. The design configures the main facilities towards the permanent western side, while the temporary seating spaces towards the eastern side. The temporary seating will be removed after the games.

In the beginning of the stadium, the reflections of the traditional Buddhist ritual Seung Moo Dance is seen. It exhibits form and space around active movement. The forces of yin and yang form the nucleus of the architectural design.  The stadium was built based on the three concepts of "incorporating light", "bringing in the rising wind", and "dancing with joy" to embody the energy of Incheon and the excitement shared by the participating countries through sporting events.

The five-story main stadium stretches across a total ground area of 113,620 m2 and is designed to seat over 60,000 spectators. Its two huge roofs form delicate undulating curves and its overall shape looks like a spaceship, which blends perfectly with the vast lawn plaza. The surrounding areas of the main stadium were designed in an environment-friendly manner, including the Eco Canal that connects two streams flowing nearby and Biotope, a small-scale ecological habitat. The sculptures throughout the stadium grounds are also noteworthy. After Asian Games come to an end, the main stadium will be re-purposed into a multi-use space for a wider range of cultural events The stadium uses eco-friendly energy, such as solar heat and terrestrial heat, as well as state-of-the-art information technologies (IT). Seven sports facilities such sports as swimming, volleyball, tennis and bowling will get under way.

Transport
The stadium has a total of 1,977 parking spaces. The stadium is served by 10 different bus stops (Line 1, 7, 13, 17, 17-1, 70, 77, 700, 700-1 and 903) and also 42-1 for 78m that is linked to downtown. Geomam station (Airport Railroad Line), Exit 1 is other transport link. Incheon Subway Line 2 has a total of 4 stations in the Asiad Park.

See also
Sports in South Korea
Incheon Munhak Stadium
Incheon Football Stadium
Yeonhui Cricket Ground
Seoul Olympic Stadium
Asian Games

References

External links

Stadium information
Stadium information
Stadium design

Sports venues in Incheon
Stadiums of the Asian Games
Multi-purpose stadiums in South Korea
Venues of the 2014 Asian Games
Asian Games athletics venues
Sports venues completed in 2014